Draw Your Own Toons is a British television programme that was produced by Buena Vista Productions UK and Meridian Broadcasting for CITV. Four series were aired between 1998 and 2001. Each series was broadcast over the space of a week in either October or December. The program was presented by children's television presenter Fearne Cotton (series 1–4), Jim Jinkins (series 1–2) and Howy Parkins (series 4).

Format
The main idea behind the show was to teach viewers how they could become artists and replicate the work of Disney artists. Each episode focused upon a different aspect of drawing cartoons. The presenters also met with the artists and directors behind Disney shows such as The Weekenders.

References

External links
 Draw Your Own Toons at BFI
 

1990s British children's television series
2000s British children's television series
1998 British television series debuts
2001 British television series endings
Arts and crafts television series
British children's education television series
ITV children's television shows
Television series by Disney
Television series by ITV Studios
Television shows produced by Meridian Broadcasting
English-language television shows